Pedesta pandita, the brown bush bob, is a species of skipper, a butterfly belonging to the family Hesperiidae. The species was first described by Lionel de Nicéville in 1885.

Description

In 1891, in his Hesperiidae Indica, Edward Yerbury Watson wrote:

Distribution and habitat
The brown bush bob is distributed from Sikkim to Arunachal Pradesh in India and is also found in Myanmar.
The flight of this infrequently seen species is fast and determined but not that fast as other fast-flying skippers. They usually fly close to the ground, and after a quick flight, will settle down in a preferred spot. They are usually spotted in wet soil or damp rock and are also found extracting nutrients from a bird droppings. Occasionally they will bask in the sun, opening their wings half-closed like other skippers. They are predominantly found in the lower elevation forest tracks or sometimes can be spotted near streams or falls.

Seasonality
The brown bush bob is best seen from April to October.

References

Hesperiidae
Butterflies of Asia
Taxa named by Lionel de Nicéville
Butterflies described in 1885